is a Japanese politician currently serving as the governor of Kagoshima Prefecture.

Political career 
Shiota served in the industrial ministry for around 30 years before running as governor in the 2020 Kagoshima gubernatorial elections. His campaign focused heavily on revitalizing the local economy, emphasizing on his previous political experience.

He ran as an independent without the endorsement of any major party. He gained support using grassroots tactics, visiting local companies and farmers. He beat incumbent governor Satoshi Mitazono in the elections, assuming office on July 28, 2020.

References 

Japanese politicians
People from Kagoshima
People from the Amami Islands
1965 births
Living people